Panikkassery Keshavan Balakrishnan (March 2, 1925 – April 3, 1991) was an Indian novelist and critic.  A doyen of Malayalam literature, he is best known for his novel, Ini Njan Urangatte (And now, Let me Sleep), a novel based on Mahabharata as well as a number of critical studies which include Chandu Menon Oru Padanam, Novel - Siddhiyum Sadhanayum, Kavyakala Kumaranasaniloode and Ezhuthachante Kala : Chila Vyasabharatha Patanangalum. His work 'Jathivyavasthayum Kerala Charitravum is a work in social history.  Kerala Sahitya Akademi awarded him their annual award for novel in 1974. He was also a recipient of the Vayalar Award and other honours.

Biography 
P. K. Balakrishnan was born on March 2, 1925, at Edavanakad, in Vypin island in Ernakulam district of the south Indian state of Kerala to Keshavan and Mani Amma. After early schooling in Edavanakkad, he joined Maharaja's College, Ernakulam but his studies were disrupted after four years when he participated in Quit India Movement and was jailed. Though he was released from jail in 1944 and he resumed his studies, he could not complete it as he joined Kochi rajya prajamandalam to enter politics only to move to Kerala Socialist Party (KSP) soon. His association with KSP brought him into contact with Mathai Manjooran, a noted Indian independence activist and KSP leader as well as others such as Perunna Thomas, Vaikom Muhammad Basheer, M. P. Krishna Pillai, M. K. Sanu. Later, he took up the editorship of Dinaparabha but he had to quit following a public speech he made at a temple in Kozhikode. Later, he became associated with such publications as Kerala Bhooshanam, Kerala Kaumudi and Madhyamam.

Balakrishnan died on April 3, 1991, at the age of 66.

Legacy 
The first of Balakrishnan's published works was a book on Narayana Guru, which was a compilation of writings on Guru, including biographical sketches, narratives on Guru's activities and his literary contributions. This was followed by critiques  Chandu Menon, Kumaran Asan and Ezhuthachan.

In his writings, he first dealt with Kerala history in the anthology on Narayana Guru, the great social reformer of Kerala who changed the face of its caste-ridden society. He brushes with Kerala history again to study why Tipu Sultan, an able ruler and administrator is perceived as an aggressor and a religious fanatic. The culmination of these studies over 3 decades was his work on the social history which departed from the established narration, titled Jaathivyavasthayum Kerala Charitravum (The Caste System and History of Kerala).

Pluto, Priyapetta Plutto, was his first novel, was a real life story about his own dog. His next novel, Ini Njan Urangatte, a Mahabharata inspired work, is considered by many to be his magnum opus. This novel,  has been translated into English by K.C. Sarsamma under the title And Now Let Me Sleep. Two decades after P. K. Balakrishnan's death, his daughter P. K. Jayalekshmy has been made another English translation under the title Battle beyond Kurukshetra. Balakrishnan also wrote a number of articles, of which only four collections have been published; two of them were published after his lifetime.

Awards and honours 
P. K. balakrishnan received the Kerala Sahitya Akademi Award for Novel in 1974 for his work, Ini Njan Urangatte. Four years later, the same novel fetched him another major award in the form of Vayalar Award of 1978. He received the Kerala History Association Award for the book, Jaathivyavasthithium Keralacharithravum. He was also a recipient of SPBF Award,  Prof. Velayudhan Endowment Award and Kesari Award.

Works 
 
 
 
 
 
 
 Ini Njan Urangatte  (And now, Let me Sleep) (1973) - A work originating from the great Indian epic Vyasabharatha (Mahabharath).
 
 Jaathivyavasthithium Keralacharithravum (The Caste system and History of Kerala) (1983) - a work in Kerala history.
 
 Keraleeyatayum Mattum (The Essence of Kerala etc.) (2004) - a collection of 20 articles published in various periodicals over a time

Translations of Ini Njan Urangatte

See also 

 List of Malayalam-language authors

References

Further reading

External links
 

1925 births
1991 deaths
Indian male novelists
20th-century Indian historians
Malayalam-language writers
Malayalam novelists
Malayalam literary critics
Recipients of the Kerala Sahitya Akademi Award
Malayalam-language journalists
20th-century Indian novelists
People from Ernakulam district
Novelists from Kerala
20th-century Indian male writers
20th-century Indian writers
Maharaja's College, Ernakulam alumni